Santiago Pérez Fernández (born 5 August 1977 in Vega de Peridiello, Asturias) is a Spanish professional road bicycle racer, who last rode for .

In March 2005, it was announced that he would be suspended for 2 years after having failed a test for homologous blood transfusion during the 2004 Vuelta a España.

Career achievements

Major results

2001
 1st Stage 5 Vuelta a Navarra
 1st Stage 7  Volta a Portugal
2002
 4th Overall Tour de Romandie
2003
 2nd Overall Escalada a Montjuïc
2004
 2nd Overall Vuelta a España
 1st Stage 14, 15 (ITT) & 21 (ITT)
2008
 6th Overall Troféu Joaquim Agostinho
2009 
 5th Overall Vuelta a Asturias
 5th Overall GP Internacional Paredes Rota dos Móveis
 8th Road race, National Road Championships
2010
 1st Subida al Naranco
 3rd Overall Troféu Joaquim Agostinho
 5th Overall Vuelta a Asturias
 9th Overall Volta ao Alentejo
2011
 1st GP Llodio
 8th Overall Vuelta a La Rioja

Grand Tour general classification results timeline

References

1977 births
Living people
Spanish male cyclists
Spanish Vuelta a España stage winners
People from Oviedo (Asturian comarca)
Cyclists from Asturias